Anthony Harding (born 30 June 2000) is an English diver. He is a silver medallist of the 2022 World Aquatics Championships.

Career 
Harding participated in the 2018 Summer Youth Olympics in Buenos Aires, where he won the silver medal behind Daniel Restrepo in the boy's 3m springboard event.

After the 2020 Summer Olympics in August 2021 Harding started training together with Jack Laugher. They won the silver medal in the synchronized 3m springboard event at the 2022 World Aquatics Championships in Budapest.

References

External links
 

2000 births
Living people
Divers at the 2018 Summer Youth Olympics
English male divers
World Aquatics Championships medalists in diving
Divers at the 2022 Commonwealth Games
Commonwealth Games medallists in diving
Commonwealth Games gold medallists for England
Medallists at the 2022 Commonwealth Games